This is a compilation of every international soccer game played by the United States men's national soccer team from 2020 through 2029. It includes the team's record for that year, each game played during the year, and the date each game was played. It also lists the U.S. goal scorers.

Home team is listed first. U.S. is listed first at home or neutral site.

Records are in win-loss-tie format. Games decided in penalty kicks are counted as ties, as per the FIFA standard.

2020

2021

2022

2023

See also
United States at the FIFA World Cup
United States at the CONCACAF Gold Cup

References

External links
 USA Men's National Team: All-time Results, 1990-present
 U.S. Soccer Federation 2016 Men's National Team Media Guide

2010
2020 in American soccer